Muqbil bin Hadi bin Muqbil bin Qa’idah al-Hamdani al-Wadi’i al-Khallali (1933 – 21 July 2001) was an Islamic scholar and a major proponent of Quietist Salafism in Yemen. He was the founder of a Madrasa in Dammaj which was known as a centre for Salafi ideology and its multi-national student population. Muqbil was noted for his fierce criticisms of the Egyptian Islamist scholar Sayyid Qutb; and is considered as an important figure by the followers of the Madkhalist movement.

Biography

Wadi'i was born sometime during the late 1920s and early 1930s near the city of Sa'adah in northern Yemen. He was said to be from a Zaydi tribe, and he was initially a Zaydi Shia. He left Yemen as a young man and travelled to Saudi Arabia to work and became acquainted with Sunni works of Islamic scholarship.

Education
After finishing primary education in Yemen, Wadi'i spent roughly two decades studying Islam in Saudi Arabia. In 1963 he began by studying at the Salafi teaching centre developed by Muhammad ibn al Uthaymeen in Najran before then being accepted to study at the Islamic University of Madinah where he attended Halaqas led by Hadith scholar Muhammad Nasiruddin al-Albani and Abdul-Ghaffar Hasan Al-Hindi as well as former Grand Mufti Abd-al-Aziz ibn Abd-Allah ibn Baz while also studying under Muhammad al-Sumali. Wadi'i is said to have graduated from the Islamic University of Madinah with a masters degree in the science of hadith.

Return to Yemen
In 1979, his stay in Saudi ended abruptly when he was indicted on suspected involvement in the Grand Mosque Seizure.  After spending a few months in prison, Grand Mufti ibn Baz negotiated his release, though Wadi'i was forced to return to his home country where he would eventually become known as the father of the modern Salafi movement within Yemen. It was there that he began to spread the Salafi Da'wah in Yemen, with much initial opposition from the local Shafi`is, Ismailis and Zaidis.

Wadi'i went on, soon after his return to his native region, to found and establish an institute that he named Dar al-Hadith al-Khayriyya in Dammaj. It would become one of the most important and influential educational institutions for Salafism in the world, teaching tens of thousands of students ranging from the Arab world to Africa to Southeast Asia and the Western world. It was during this time that Wadi'i, along with Ja'far 'Umar Thalib, established close ties between Yemeni and Indonesian Salafis.

In the 1980s Wadi'i accepted grants from various sources such as Ibn Baz and the Saudi Government of 15,000 Saudi Riyals every two months. However, his continued critique of the Saudi monarch, due to his believed wrongful imprisonment, led him to be more independent in the financing of the institute's operations. He stated that managing the mosque and institute in Dammaj required little funding and was easily covered by local donations and zakat. Wadi'i was opposed to the rapid expansion of the Muslim Brotherhood movement across Yemeni schools in the 1980s, and opened the Dar al-hadith religious institute  in Dammaj in order to rebut Islamist movements and champion Quietist Salafi interpretations.

In 2014, Wadi'i's institute, Dar al-Hadeeth would be shut down after a long Siege of Dammaj by Houthi rebels. The manager of the institute, Yahya al-Hajuri, as well as thousands of foreign students were forced to relocate to Al Hudaydah Governorate.

Death
After a prolonged illness, and hospital treatment in Jeddah, Saudi Arabia, Cologne,Germany and Los Angeles, California, Wadi'i died on July 21, 2001 from either cirrhosis or liver cancer. His funeral prayer was performed in the Masjid al-Haram  in Makkah and he was laid to rest in the Al-'Adl cemetery close to the graves of Ibn Baz and Muhammad ibn al Uthaymeen.  After his death, reports continued to surface of changes in curriculum and power struggles at the Dar al-Hadith, although these rumours were dispelled a few years later by contemporary Muslim scholar Rabee Al-Madkhali.

Links to Guantanamo detainees
Joint Task Force Guantanamo counter-terrorism analysts prepared Summary of Evidence memos offering justifications for continuing to hold them in extrajudicial detention.  Several of the captives had their detention justified, in part, through their association with Al Wadi.

Views

On Terrorism
Wadi'i made a number of statements against terrorism and attempted to advise Osama bin Laden against it, whom he blames - along with older movements like the Muslim Brotherhood - for many of the problems Muslims face today; he further commented in an interview:

I did in fact send my advice and warning (to bin Laden) but only Allah knows if it actually arrived or not. However, some of those people did come to us, offering their help and assistance in preaching and calling to Allah. Afterwards, we found them sending money, requesting that we distribute it among the leaders of various tribes; they were trying to buy rocket-launchers and machine guns. But I refused them and told them to never come to my house again. I made it clear to them that what we do is preach only and we don’t allow our students to do anything but that.
Waadi'ee had earlier authored a book as well, referring to bin Laden as the head of all "sectarianism," "partisanship," "division," and "religious ignorance," and accusing him putting money into weapons while ignoring his religion. Additionally he was a huge supporter of the controversial Saudi preacher Rabi'i ibn Hadi al-Madkhali, the founder of the Madkhalist movement. Feircly critiquing the Muslim Brothers, Wadi'i states:"They [the Muslim Brotherhood] are bankrupt as it relates to knowledge and bankrupt as it relates to Daʿwah... The founder of this group – which is Ḥasan al-Bannā – used to make Ṭawāf around the graves...They [the Muslim Brotherhood] are prepared to cooperate with the Devil against Ahl al-Sunnah.”
Wadi'i was also a staunch critic of the Salafi scholar Muhammad ibn Salih al-Munajjid, accusing him of being a misguided "Sururi". His Dar ul-Hadith seminary and institute of Dammaj was known to oppose al-Qaeda and other radical extremist organisations, as Wadi'i himself stated in an interview with Hassan al-Zayidi of the Yemen Times in 2000.

His Fiqh
In terms of Islamic jurisprudence, Wadi'i did not follow any established school of thought in Islam and opposed the practice of Taqlid, or subordination to higher legal authority. His views on the principles of Islamic jurisprudence were almost identical with those of the Zahiri school; he rejected the usage of Qiyas, or analogical reasoning, in deriving rulings in Islamic jurisprudence entirely, recommending the books of Zahiri scholar Ibn Hazm in the principles of jurisprudence for details on the topic. Waadi'i was fond of the works of Ibn Hazm, to the point that, when asked about Ibn Hazm's Zahirism, he advised every Muslim "to be a Zahiri."

On Yemen
Wadi'i believed that even the sinful and corrupt leaders must be obeyed by the Muslims while advising the leader must be done by the learned scholar in private. Additionally, the Muslims are commanded to endure hardship and be patient until Allah removes the burden of an oppressive ruler for that of a better one.

Wadi'i thought that South Yemen's colonial rule by Britain was better than its independence in 1967, due to the fact that independence had allowed a socialist government to come to power and also resulted in the unnecessary death of Muslims. Although claiming to be neutral by assuming a neutral or apolitical stance, Wadi'i maintained excellent relations with the Yemeni government after unification. This was in fact done by his de facto support of the Yemeni government via his stances on issues such as not partaking or calling to elections and political parties or candidates as well as cooperating with the Yemeni government against common enemies such as extreme Zaydi militias and the Muslim Brotherhood's local chapter.

On Saudi Arabia
While critical of the Saudi government throughout the 1980s and 1990s, Wadi'i never compromised by siding with the Sahwa movement and its preachers. He vocally opposed them and their methods of overtly calling to politics and labeled them with hizbiyyah, or partisanship. He harbored hard feelings against Saudi Arabia up until toward the end of his life, when he would ultimately recant his criticism, speaking highly of the country and its authorities.

Works
 al-Ilhad al-Khomeini fi Ard al-Haramayn or the Impudence of Khomeini on the Land of the Two Holy Sanctuaries (criticism of the Iranian Revolution)

See also
Yahya al-Hajuri

References

External links
English translations of his works
Translations from the students of Madinah
His autobiography
Indonesia His autobiography

1933 births
2001 deaths
Converts to Sunni Islam from Shia Islam
Hadith scholars
Salafi movement
Yemeni Sunni Muslim scholars of Islam
Islamic University of Madinah alumni
Saudi Arabian Salafis
Zahiris
Yemeni Salafis
Salafi Quietists
Yemeni emigrants to Saudi Arabia